Astragalus monspessulanus is a plant species in the genus Astragalus.

References

monspessulanus
Plants described in 1753
Taxa named by Carl Linnaeus